Untitled is an outdoor 1977 painted aluminum sculpture by Ivan Morrison, located at Southwest 5th Avenue and Southwest Oak Street in the Transit Mall of Portland, Oregon.

Description

Parts are painted blue, red, yellow and white and contains no inscriptions. The Smithsonian Institution categorizes the sculpture as abstract (geometric). Untitled was surveyed and considered "treatment urgent" by Smithsonian's "Save Outdoor Sculpture!" program in 1993.

The work is part of the collection of the Regional Arts & Culture Council. It has been included in at least one published walking tour of Portland. The tour's author said the sculpture's panels "form a child-size hiding place".

See also
 1977 in art

References

External links

 A Guide to Portland Public Art (PDF), Regional Art & Culture Council
 Art on the MAX Green Line: TriMet Public Art Program (PDF), TriMet

1977 establishments in Oregon
1977 sculptures
Abstract sculptures in Oregon
Aluminum sculptures in Oregon
Outdoor sculptures in Portland, Oregon
Sculptures on the MAX Green Line
Southwest Portland, Oregon